Final Recipe is a 2013 South Korean-Thai drama film directed by Gina Kim and written by George Huang, who adapted a story by Kim.  It stars Michelle Yeoh, Henry Lau, and Chin Han.  Lau plays a young man who must impress the host of a cooking show (Yeoh) and her chef husband (Han) to save his grandfather's restaurant.  It premiered at the San Sebastián International Film Festival.

Plot 
Red Phoenix's Singaporean restaurant is in danger of going out of business due to the owner Hao's difficult personality. Hao was once a famous chef. Now Hao's only hope is that his grandson Mark (Yi han)  enters a prestigious university to become an engineer.  However Mark's dream is to follow his grandfather's footsteps and become a chef and take over the family restaurant. Mark secretly travels to Shanghai to attend a cooking competition without his grandfather's knowledge and consent. He takes the place of a contestant who did not show up. Finally he competes against talented chefs from Japan, Korea and Australia, and freely shows off ravishing cooking skills that he has accumulated from his grandfather over the years.

As Mark wins round after round and gains attention, Julia, the contest producer notices something peculiar about him, then slowly realizes that Mark and her husband David resemble each other.

Cast 
 Michelle Yeoh as Julia Lee
 Henry Lau as Mark
 Chin Han as David Chen
 Chang Tseng as Hao
 Lori Tan Chinn as Mrs. Wang
 Bobby Lee as Park
 Lika Minamoto as Kaori
 Aden Young as Sean
 Byron Bishop as Chef Gio Kwan
 Patrick Teoh as Mr. Lee
 Sahajak Boonthanakit as Detective Jack Jien

Production 
Production started in Thailand on May 24, 2012, and the film was reported to be in post-production by January 31, 2013.

Release 
Final Recipe premiered at the San Sebastián International Film Festival on September 21, 2013.

Reception 
Jay Weissberg of Variety called it a shallow and predictable film but said that Yeoh "makes the saccharine flavors go down slightly better".  Clarence Tsui of The Hollywood Reporter described it as "a mild, feel-good tale about reconciliation of three generations of a cookery-gifted clan".  Mark Adams of Screen Daily wrote, "The heart of Final Recipe may be pure melodrama, but it is a glossy and enjoyable journey."

References

External links 
 
 

2013 films
2013 drama films
South Korean drama films
English-language South Korean films
English-language Thai films
Cooking films
2010s English-language films
2010s Mandarin-language films
2010s South Korean films